These women have represented Puerto Rico in the following international beauty pageants:
Miss World
Miss Universe
Miss International
Miss Earth

Miss World

The Miss World pageant began in 1951 and since then Puerto Rico has had 15 representatives classify in the finals, including 2 winners, 2 runners-up, 10 semi-finalists and 1 quarter-finalist.

Miss Universe

The Miss Universe pageant began in 1952 and since then Puerto Rico has had 21 representatives classify in the finals, including 5 winners, 8 runners-up, 6 finalists and 2 semi-finalists. With 5 wins, Puerto Rico is the third country with the most wins behind USA (8 wins) and Venezuela (7 wins).

Miss International

The Miss International pageant began in 1960 and since then Puerto Rico has had 13 representatives classify in the finals, including 2 winners, 1 runner-up and 10 semi-finalists.

Miss Earth

The Miss Earth pageant began in 2001 and since then Puerto Rico has had 2 representatives classify in the finals, including 1 runner-up and 1 finalist.

References

External links
Miss Universe Puerto Rico
Por La Corona
Miss Universe

Miss Puerto Rico titleholders
Miss Puerto Rico titleholders
Miss Puerto Rico titleholders